The 2021 season is the 124th season of competitive football in Sweden. The men's team will be attempting to qualify for the World Cup 2022, and the women's team will be attempting to qualify for the Women's World Cup 2023.

Domestic results

Men's football

2021 Allsvenskan

2021 Superettan

Women's football

2021 Damallsvenskan

2021 Elitettan

National teams

Sweden men's national football team

Friendlies

World Cup 2022 Qualifying

Matches

Euro 2020

Group E

Matches
Group Stage

Round of 16

Sweden women's national football team

2021

References 

 
Seasons in Swedish football